State Route 725 (SR 725) is an east–west state highway in the southwestern portion of the U.S. state of Ohio.

Route description
The portion of SR 725 between Union Road and Soldiers Home Road in Miamisburg is designated as the "SGT Gary Lee McKiddy Memorial Highway", in honor of a 1968 Miamisburg High School graduate and U.S. Army sergeant; this portion of the route runs past Highland Memorial Cemetery, which is McKiddy's resting place. On May 6, 1970, McKiddy, a 20-year-old member of the 1st Squadron, 9th Cavalry Regiment, 1st Cavalry Division, was serving in Cambodia during the Vietnam War; on that date, he pulled a fellow soldier from a burning helicopter; McKiddy then returned to the helicopter in an attempt to rescue the pilot; as he did, the helicopter exploded, killing both McKiddy and the pilot.

The portion of SR 725 between Heincke Road and SR 741 in Miamisburg is designated as the "Marine Corporal Paul W. Zanowick II Memorial Highway", in honor of a Miamisburg High School graduate, nicknamed "Rocky", who was killed in Nahre Saraj District, Helmand Province, Afghanistan on June 3, 2011.

History
SR 725 was first commissioned in 1937 between the Indiana state line and SR 48 in Centerville. In 1939, the route was extended east to US 42 in Spring Valley. In 1965, the road between Miamisburg and I-75 was upgraded to a divided highway. Between 1993 and 1995 the section of highway between I-675 and Centerville was upgraded to a divided highway.

Major intersections

References

725
Transportation in Preble County, Ohio
Transportation in Montgomery County, Ohio
Transportation in Greene County, Ohio